Campestre may refer to:

Places
Brazil
Campestre, Alagoas
Campestre, Minas Gerais
Campestre da Serra, Rio Grande do Sul
Campestre de Goiás, Goiás
Campestre do Maranhão, Maranhão
Campestre do Menino Deus, Santa Maria, Rio Grande do Sul
São José do Campestre, Rio Grande do Norte

Colombia
Club Campestre El Rancho
Gimnasio Campestre

France
Campestre-et-Luc, commune in the Gard department

Mexico
Campestre (Ciudad Juárez), an area of Ciudad Juárez

Plants
Acer campestre
Cheiracanthium campestre
Compsibidion campestre
Epidendrum campestre
Eryngium campestre
Geastrum campestre
Lepidium campestre
Symphyotrichum campestre
Trifolium campestre